Lee Aaron is the fourth studio album by singer Lee Aaron, released on 17 February 1987 through Attic Records; a remastered edition was reissued in 2002 through Unidisc Music. It is Aaron's third-highest charting album, reaching No. 39 on the Canadian albums chart and remaining on that chart for seventeen weeks, as well as reaching the top 60 in three other countries. Two singles reached the Canadian singles chart: "Only Human" at No. 44 and "Goin' Off the Deep End" at No. 93.

Critical reception

Glenn Miller at AllMusic gave Lee Aaron three stars out of five, describing it as "refreshing, showcasing the best songwriting and strongest music of [Aaron's] career", and that she "succeeds in this softer, commercial vein with mature subject matter."

Track listing

Personnel

Lee Aaron – lead vocals, background vocals, arrangement
John Albani – guitar, background vocals, arrangement
Jim Gelcer – keyboard, background vocals, arrangement
Randy Cooke – drums, percussion, arrangement
Chris Brockway – bass, background vocals, arrangement
David Roberts – background vocals (tracks 3, 5), arrangement
Peter Coleman – arrangement, production

Chart performance

Album

Singles

References

External links
Lee Aaron at leeaaron.com

Lee Aaron albums
1987 albums
Attic Records albums
Albums recorded at Metalworks Studios